John Weldon may refer to:

 John Weldon (animator) (born 1945), Canadian animator
 John Weldon (musician) (1676–1736), British musician
 John Wesley Weldon (died 1885), lawyer, judge and political figure in the Province of New Brunswick, Canada

See also
 Brinsley MacNamara (1890–1963), Irish writer, born John Weldon